The white-lored antpitta or fulvous-bellied antpitta (Hylopezus fulviventris) is a species of bird in the family Grallariidae. It is found in Colombia, Ecuador, and Peru. Its natural habitats are subtropical or tropical moist lowland forest and heavily degraded former forest.

References

white-lored antpitta
Birds of the Colombian Amazon
Birds of the Ecuadorian Amazon
Birds of the Peruvian Amazon
white-lored antpitta
white-lored antpitta
Taxonomy articles created by Polbot